The Horsham Football & Netball Club, nicknamed the Demons, is an Australian rules football and netball club based in the city of Horsham, Victoria. The football team competes in the Wimmera Football League (WFL).

The Horsham Demons, formed in 1892, were one of three foundation clubs which joined the Wimmera District Football Association in 1902 and have played in the WFL since its formation in 1937.

Despite claiming only three premierships before 1960, Horsham has become easily the most successful club in the WFL, winning an unprecedented ten successive flags from 2003 to 2012.

References

External links
 Facebook page

Sports clubs established in 1892
Australian rules football clubs established in 1892
Wimmera Football League clubs
1892 establishments in Australia